SENASA Perú is an agency within the Peruvian Ministry of Agriculture. SENASA is responsible for protecting the country against agricultural pests and diseases in both crops and livestock. SENASA handles communications, import inspections, export inspections, and treaty negotiations regarding agricultural health; for example participating in the International Plant Protection Convention and making agreements with foreign governments.

References

Phytosanitary authorities
Agriculture in Peru
Government agencies of Peru